This is a partial list of topics related to São Tomé and Príncipe.

Geography 

 Extreme points of São Tomé and Príncipe
 List of volcanoes in São Tomé and Príncipe
 List of beaches of São Tomé and Príncipe

Landforms

Islands 
 Ilheu Bom Bom
 Ilhéu das Cabras
 Ilhéu Caroço
 Ilhéu das Rolas
 Príncipe
 Rolas
 São Tomé Island
 Tinhosa Grande
 Tinhosa Pequena

Mountains 
 Pico de São Tomé

Settlements 

 Guadalupe, São Tomé and Príncipe
 Neves, São Tomé and Príncipe
 Santana, São Tomé and Príncipe
 Santo António
 São João dos Angolares
 São Tomé
 Trindade

History 

 Batepá massacre
 Elections in São Tomé and Príncipe
 São Tomé and Príncipe legislative election, 1991
 São Tomé and Príncipe legislative election, 1994
 São Tomé and Príncipe legislative election, 1998
 São Tomé and Príncipe legislative election, 2002
 São Tomé and Príncipe legislative election, 2006
 São Tomé and Príncipe presidential election, 1991
 São Tomé and Príncipe presidential election, 1996
 São Tomé and Príncipe presidential election, 2001
 São Tomé and Príncipe presidential election, 2006
 List of colonial heads of São Tomé and Príncipe

Government and politics 

 Elections in São Tomé and Príncipe
 Human rights in São Tomé and Príncipe
 Military of São Tomé and Príncipe
 National Assembly of São Tomé and Príncipe

Administrative divisions 

 São Tomé (capital: São Tomé)
 Água Grande District
 Cantagalo District
 Caué District
 Lembá District
 Lobata District
 Mé-Zóchi District
 Autonomous Region of Príncipe (capital: Santo António)
 Pagué District

Foreign relations 

 Diplomatic missions of São Tomé and Príncipe
 List of diplomatic missions in São Tomé and Príncipe
 Nigeria–São Tomé and Príncipe Joint Development Authority
 São Tomé and Príncipe–United States relations

Political parties 

 Christian Democratic Front
 Democratic Convergence Party-Reflection Group
 Democratic Renovation Party (São Tomé)
 Force for Change Democratic Movement-Liberal Party
 Independent Democratic Action
 Independent Democratic Union of São Tomé and Príncipe
 Movement for the Liberation of São Tomé and Príncipe/Social Democratic Party
 National Democratic Action of São Tomé and Príncipe
 National Resistance Front of São Tomé and Príncipe
 National Resistance Front of São Tomé and Príncipe-Renewal
 National Union for Democracy and Progress (São Tomé)
 New Way Movement
 Opposition Democratic Coalition
 People's Party of Progress
 Social Liberal Party (São Tomé)
 Social Renewal Party (São Tomé)
 São Toméan Workers Party
 Ue-Kedadji
 Union of Democrats for Citizenship and Development

Politicians 

 List of heads of government of São Tomé and Príncipe
 Leonel Mário d'Alva
 Miguel Trovoada
 Celestino Rocha da Costa
 Daniel Daio
 Norberto Costa Alegre
 Evaristo Carvalho
 Carlos Graça
 Armindo Vaz d'Almeida
 Raul Bragança Neto
 Guilherme Posser da Costa
 Gabriel Costa
 Maria das Neves
 Damião Vaz d'Almeida
 Maria do Carmo Silveira
 Tomé Vera Cruz
 Patrice Trovoada
 Joaquim Rafael Branco
 List of heads of state of São Tomé and Príncipe
 Manuel Pinto da Costa
 Miguel Trovoada
 Manuel Quintas de Almeida
 Fradique de Menezes
 Fernando Pereira
 Ministers of the São Toméan Government
 List of Foreign Ministers of São Tomé and Príncipe
 List of presidents of the Regional Government of Príncipe

Economy 

 Mineral industry of São Tomé and Príncipe
 National Bank of São Tomé and Príncipe
 São Tomé and Príncipe dobra
 São Tomé and Príncipe escudo

Companies

Airlines 
 Air São Tomé and Príncipe (defunct)
 STP Airways

Banks 
 Afriland First Bank
 Banco Internacional de São Tomé e Príncipe
 National Bank of São Tomé and Príncipe

Trade unions 
 General Union of the Workers of São Tomé and Príncipe
 National Organization of the Workers of São Tomé and Príncipe - Central Union

Communications 

 .st (Internet country code top-level domain)
 RTP África

Transport

Airports 

 Príncipe Airport
 São Tomé International Airport (Salazar Airport)

Demographics 

 List of people from São Tomé and Príncipe

Ethnic groups 
 Beti-Pahuin
 Cape Verdean São Toméan

Languages 
 Portuguese language (official language)
 Forro language
 Angolar language
 Principense language
 French language

Religion 
 Islam in São Tomé and Príncipe
 Roman Catholic Diocese of São Tomé and Príncipe

Culture 

 Public holidays in São Tomé and Príncipe

Education 

 University of São Tomé and Príncipe

Music

National symbols 
 Coat of arms of São Tomé and Príncipe
 Flag of São Tomé and Príncipe
 Independência total

Sport 

 Estádio Nacional 12 de Julho

Football 
 São Toméan Football Federation
 São Tomé and Príncipe national football team

Football clubs 
 1º de Maio
 6 de Setembro
 Agrosport
 Andorinha Sport Club
 Bairros Unidos FC
 Caixão Grande (football club)
 Clube Desportivo de Guadalupe
 Desportivo Marítimo
 FC Porto Real
 Futebol Club Aliança Nacional
 GD Os Operários
 GD Sundy
 Grupo Desportivo Cruz Vermelha
 Desportivo de Guadalupe
 Inter Bom-Bom
 Os Dinâmicos
 Santana FC
 Sporting Praia Cruz
 UDESCAI
 UDRA
 União Desportiva Aeroporto, Picão e Belo Monte
 Vitória FC (Riboque)

Football competitions 
 Principe Island League
 São Tomé Island League
 São Tomé and Principe Championship
 Taça Nacional de São Tomé e Principe

Olympics 

 São Tomé and Príncipe at the 1996 Summer Olympics
 São Tomé and Príncipe at the 2000 Summer Olympics
 São Tomé and Príncipe at the 2004 Summer Olympics
 São Tomé and Príncipe at the 2008 Summer Olympics

Environment

Wildlife 

 List of mammals in São Tomé and Príncipe
 List of birds of São Tomé and Príncipe

See also 
 Lists of country-related topics
 List of lists of African country-related topics by country